The 3rd constituency of Borsod-Abaúj-Zemplén County is one of the single member constituencies of the National Assembly, the national legislature of Hungary. The constituency standard abbreviation: Borsod-Abaúj-Zemplén 03. OEVK.

Since 2014, it has been represented by Gábor Riz of the Fidesz–KDNP party alliance.

Geography
The 3rd constituency is located in north-western part of Borsod-Abaúj-Zemplén County.

List of municipalities
The constituency includes the following municipalities:

History
The 3rd constituency of Borsod-Abaúj-Zemplén County was created in 2011 and contained of the pre-2011 abolished constituencies of 5th and part of 6th, 7th and 8th constituency of this County. Its borders have not changed since its creation.

Members
The constituency was first represented by Gábor Riz of the Fidesz from 2014, and he was re-elected in 2018 and 2022.

Election result

2014 election

References

Borsod-Abauj-Zemplen 3rd